Nazarian is an Iranian Jewish surname as it is derived from “Nazar” which means “opinion” in Persian.

Nazarian or Nazaryan is also an Armenian surname, and its meaning can be roughly translated into "son of Nazar." It can refer to the following people:

Nazarian
 Angella Nazarian, Iranian-born author 
 Bruce Nazarian, an American musician
 David Nazarian, Iranian-born businessman 
 Eric Nazarian, an Armenian-American film director
 Izak Parviz Nazarian, Iranian-born American billionaire and entrepreneur 
 John James Nazarian, an American private investigator
 Sam Nazarian, an Iranian born American entrepreneur
 Santiago Nazarian, a Brazilian writer 
 Sharon Nazarian, Iranian-born Senior Vice President of International Affairs for the Anti-Defamation League
 Stepanos Nazarian, an Armenian publisher, historian of literature and orientalist
 Vera Nazarian, a Russian-born American writer of Armenian ancestry  
 Younes Nazarian, Iranian born American entrepreneur

Nazaryan
 Armen Nazaryan, an Armenian Greco-Roman wrestler
 Armen Nazaryan (judoka), an Armenian judoka 
 Rafael Nazaryan, an Armenian football player

Nazariantz
Hrand Nazariantz (1886-1962), Ottoman Armenian journalist and supporter of Armenian independence

See also 
Nazari

References 

Armenian-language surnames